Copper Creek Records is a record label based in Roanoke, Virginia specializing primarily in bluegrass and old-time music.

History
Spurred by his interest in the music of the Stanley Brothers, Gary B. Reid launched Copper Creek in October 1978. Their first release was a 45 rpm single by the Johnson Mountain Boys. Side A was "When I Can Forget" and side B was "Johnson Mountain Hoedown."

Initially, Copper Creek's focus was on releasing albums by the Johnson Mountain Boys, but expanded into historic preservation, annotation, and release of early bluegrass recordings and radio broadcasts.

Cooper Creek became a thriving and respected label for bluegrass and old-time music artists and listeners.

As sales of recorded music have decreased, Reid has focused primarily on writing and his one-man show "A Life of Sorrow, the Life and Times of Carter Stanley."

For his book The Music of the Stanley Brothers (University of Illinois Press), Reid was named Bluegrass Print/Media Person of the Year by the International Bluegrass Music Association (IBMA).

Artists
Here is a partial list of artists who have released recordings on the Copper Creek label.

 E.C. and Orna Ball
 The Blue Sky Boys
 Bluegrass Cardinals
 Bluegrass Patriots
 Chris Brashear and Peter McLaughlin
 Gary Brewer
 Hylo Brown
 Albert E. Brumley Jr.
 The Carter Family
 The Country Gentlemen
 East Coast Bluegrass Band
 The Crooked Jades
 Crowe Brothers
 East Virginia
 Tony Ellis
 Raymond Fairchild
 Lester Flatt & Earl Scruggs & The Foggy Mountain Boys
 Alice Gerrard
 Tom T. Hall
 Ginny Hawker & Kay Justice
 Mike Henderson
 Trey Hensley & Drivin' Force
 Adam Hurt
 Randall Hylton
 Johnson Mountain Boys
 Carol Elizabeth Jones & Laurel Bliss
 Kathy Kallick
 Maro Kawabata
 Dick Kimmel
 James Leva
 Local Exchange
 The Louvin Brothers
 Claire Lynch
 McPeak Brothers
 The Mysterious Redbirds
 New Roanoke Jug Band
 Michelle Nixon
 Patent Pending
 Ken Perlam
 Tony Ramey
 James Reams & the Barnstormers
 John Reischman and the Jaybirds
 Reno and Smiley
 Curly Seckler
 George Shuffler
 Steve Sparkman
 Ron Spears
 Ralph Stanley
 The Stanley Brothers
 Jack Tottle
 Roland White Band
 Josh Williams & High Gear
 Wolfe Brothers

See also 
 List of record labels

References

American record labels
American independent record labels